Panama participated at the 2018 Summer Youth Olympics in Buenos Aires, Argentina from 6 October to 18 October 2018.

Athletics

Equestrian

Panama qualified a rider based on its ranking in the FEI World Jumping Challenge Rankings.

 Individual Jumping - 1 athlete

Futsal

Boys' tournament

Group stage

Judo

Individual

Team

Swimming

Weightlifting

References

2018 in Panamanian sport
Nations at the 2018 Summer Youth Olympics
Panama at the Youth Olympics